Things We Lost in the Fire is the fifth studio album by American indie rock band Low. It was released on January 22, 2001, on Kranky.

In 2006, the album was performed live in its entirety as part of the All Tomorrow's Parties-curated Don't Look Back series.

Recording
Things We Lost in the Fire was engineered by Steve Albini at Electrical Audio in Chicago.

Editions
Some overseas editions of the album contain the additional tracks "Overhead" and "Don't Carry It All", which were B-sides of the "Dinosaur Act" single, and were also published later on the 2004 box set of rarities, A Lifetime of Temporary Relief: 10 Years of B-Sides and Rarities. These two tracks were also included on the vinyl LP release of the album. This is a three-sided album, with the fourth side containing the song lyrics etched into the vinyl. In the UK the album was released by Tugboat Records (catalogue number TUGLP 027).

Critical reception

Things We Lost in the Fire garnered a score of 87 out of 100 on review aggregate site Metacritic, indicating "universal acclaim". Online music magazine Pitchfork placed Things We Lost in the Fire at number 117 on its list of top 200 albums of the 2000s and number 14 on its list of the 30 best dream pop albums. Things We Lost in the Fire was listed on NMEs "Darkest Albums Ever: 50 of the Best" at number 36. The album was ranked 93rd on The Guardian's 100 Best Albums of the 21st Century list, based on a 2019 poll of music writers.

Track listing

References

2001 albums
Low (band) albums
Kranky albums
albums produced by Steve Albini